Senator Owens may refer to:

Bill Owens (Colorado politician) (born 1950), Colorado State Senate
Bill Owens (Massachusetts politician) (born 1937), Massachusetts State Senate
James W. Owens (congressman) (1837–1900), Ohio State Senate
Major Owens (1936–2013), New York State Senate
Tim Owens (politician) (born 1945), Kansas State Senate

See also
Senator Owen (disambiguation)